Ridell is a surname. Notable people with the surname include:

Josefine Ridell (born 1997), Swedish singer, participant in the Junior Eurovision Song Contest 2010
Mi Ridell (born 1968), Swedish actor and singer
Sunny Ridell, American singer and entertainer

See also
Riddell
Ridel